2 Samuel 5 is the fifth chapter of the Second Book of Samuel in the Old Testament of the Christian Bible or the second part of Books of Samuel in the Hebrew Bible. According to Jewish tradition  the book was attributed to the prophet Samuel, with additions by the prophets Gad and Nathan, but modern scholars view it as a composition of a number of independent texts of various ages from c. 630–540 BCE. This chapter contains the account of David's reign in Hebron and Jerusalem. This is within a section comprising 1 Samuel 16 to 2 Samuel 5 which records the rise of David as the king of Israel, and a section comprising 2 Samuel 2–8 which deals with the period when David set up his kingdom.

Text
This chapter was originally written in the Hebrew language. It is divided into 25 verses.

Textual witnesses
Some early manuscripts containing the text of this chapter in Hebrew are of the Masoretic Text tradition, which includes the Codex Cairensis (895), Aleppo Codex (10th century), and Codex Leningradensis (1008). Fragments containing parts of this chapter in Hebrew were found among the Dead Sea Scrolls including 4Q51 (4QSam; 100–50 BCE) with extant verses 1–3, 6–16, 18–19.

Extant ancient manuscripts of a translation into Koine Greek known as the Septuagint (originally was made in the last few centuries BCE) include Codex Vaticanus (B; B; 4th century) and Codex Alexandrinus (A; A; 5th century).

Old Testament references
: 
:

Places 

Baal-perazim
Geba
Gezer
Jerusalem
Millo
Tyre
Valley of Rephaim

Analysis
The narrative of David's reign in Hebron in 2 Samuel 1:1–5:5 has the following structure:
A. Looking back to the final scenes of 1 Samuel (1:1)
B. David receives Saul's crown (1:2-12)
C. David executes Saul's killer (1:13-16)
D. David's lament for Saul and Jonathan (1:17-27)
E. Two kings in the land (2:1-3:6)
E'. One king in the land: Abner switches sides (3:7-27)
D'. David's lament for Abner (3:28-39)
C'. David executes Ishbaal's killers (4:1-12)
B'. David wears Saul's crown (5:1-3)
A'. Looking forward to David's reign in Jerusalem (5:4-5)

David's narrative of his ascension to the throne in Hebron is framed by an opening verse that looks backward to the final chapters of 1 Samuel (Saul's death and David's refuge in Ziklag) and closing verses that look forward to David's rule in Jerusalem (2 Samuel 5). The action begins when David received Saul's crown and concludes when he was finally able to wear that crown. David executes the Amalekite who claims to have assisted Saul with his suicide and those who murdered Ishbaal. Two laments were recorded: one for Saul and Jonathan and another shorter one for Abner. At the center are the two key episodes: the existence of two kings in the land (David and Ishbaal), because Joab's forces could not conquer Saul's territory on the battlefield. However, this was resolved when Ishbaal foolishly challenged Abner's loyalty, causing Abner to switch sides that eventually brought Saul's kingdom under Davidic rule.

David anointed king of all Israel (5:1–5)
With Ishbaal's death, David had no more rival for the throne of Israel (verses 1–2). The "tribes of Israel", noting his ties with the house of Saul, his proven leadership against the Philistines as well as God's promises to make him king, sent the 'elders of Israel' (cf. 'elders of Judah' in 2 Samuel 2:4) to Hebron to make 'a covenant... before the LORD', then anoint David as 'king'.

Verse 3
Therefore all the elders of Israel came to the king at Hebron, and King David made a covenant with them at Hebron before the LORD. And they anointed David king over Israel.
"They anointed David king over Israel": this was the third anointing of David, as the first was by Samuel, the second was by the tribe of Judah, and now by all the tribes of Israel, with great numbers of the people eating, drinking and rejoicing with David (1 Chronicles 12:1).

David conquered Jerusalem (5:6–10)
The next important step was the capture of Jerusalem (verses 6–9), which until then was occupied by the  'Jebusites', who were of Canaanite origin (Genesis 10:16). The name of Jerusalem is found in Egyptian Execration texts of the 19th and 18th centuries BCE and in the Amarna texts of the 14th century BCE. The Israelites did not capture the city when they conquered Canaan (Joshua 15:63; Judges 1:21), so it became a foreign independent enclave until David captured it. The fortress (or stronghold) is strategically located away from the main north–south routes and situated more or less on the border between Judah and the rest of Israel, so it was a wise choice as capital. The Jebusites were so confident that their city could never be taken, so they said to David that even handicapped persons, 'the blind and the lame', would be able to defend it (verse 6). When David conquered the city he used the phrase back to call the defeated defenders 'the lame and the blind' (verse 8). The attackers went 'up the water shaft' to enter the city (verse 8), that is, the vertical shaft from the city to the Spring of Gihon, then David occupied the fortress on the hill in the south-eastern corner of Jerusalem, also called "Ophel", and renamed it 'the city of David'. The account of David capturing of the city has a fitting conclusion in verse 10, which could be intended as the closing statement of the history of David's rise to the throne of Israel.

Verse 9
So David dwelt in the fort, and called it the city of David. And David built round about from Millo and inward.
"Millo": was an earth-fill to form a rampart or a platform, terracing on the eastern slope. In Hebrew this word always used with the definite article (except in Judges 9:6; Judges 9:20). The name is probably from an old Canaanite word for 'the fortification on the northern end of Mount Zion'. Solomon (1 Kings 11:27) and Hezekiah (2 Chronicles 32:5) strengthened it.

Verse 10
And David went on, and grew great, and the Lord God of hosts was with him..
"The Lord God of hosts": the word "God" is not found in 4QSam or the Greek Septuagint, probably to have harmonization with the more common biblical phrase “the Lord of hosts".

David's growing  fame and family (5:11–16)
This section contains two brief notes:
 Verses 11–12 reports the negotiations with king Hiram of Tyre, who had building materials and craftsmen for David's building projects. It can also refer to a later period
in David's reign as Hiram also helped with
Solomon's building projects.
 Verses 13–16 lists the sons born to David in Jerusalem as a continuation of the list in 2 Samuel 3:2–5. The same list, with some variations, is given in 1 Chronicles 3:5–8 and 1 Chronicles 14:5–7.

Verse 14
And these be the names of those that were born unto him in Jerusalem; Shammua, and Shobab, and Nathan, and Solomon,
"Nathan and Solomon": According to The four sons listed here, according to he parallel reading in 1 Chronicles 3:5 were born of Bathsheba (Bath-shua), so in a later period of David's reign. Solomon and Nathan are the two sons of David through whom the Gospels of Matthew and Luke respectively trace the genealogy of Jesus Christ.

Two victories over the Philistines (5:17–25)
The narrative of David's two victories over the Philistines could be connected with an earlier point when he was 'anointed king over Israel' (verse 17), where his 'stronghold' was not yet Jerusalem, but could be Adullam. On both occasions David consulted God, receiving a distinct reply for each — straight positive on the first event, but a negative on the second occasion, followed by further advice — leading to victories in all cases.
The Philistines came up to Rephaim, a plain located south-west of Jerusalem, and in the first battle David defeated them at Baal-perazim ('Lord of Bursting Forth'). In the second battle David was advised to take a different route and attack from the flank
in the vicinity of 'balsam trees', bushy plants characteristic of a hilly region. The second  victory was decisive as the Philistines were pushed 'from Geba' (Septuagint reads 'from Gibeon', six miles north-west of Jerusalem) back to their border at Gezer.

See also

Related Bible parts: Joshua 15, Judges 9, 1 Chronicles 3, 1 Chronicles 12, 1 Chronicles 14, 2 Chronicles 32, Matthew 1, Luke 3

Notes

References

Sources

Commentaries on Samuel

General

External links
 Jewish translations:
 Samuel II - II Samuel - Chapter 5 (Judaica Press). Hebrew text and English translation [with Rashi's commentary] at Chabad.org
 Christian translations:
 Online Bible at GospelHall.org (ESV, KJV, Darby, American Standard Version, Bible in Basic English)
 2 Samuel chapter 5. Bible Gateway

05